Build Back Better may refer to:

Building Back Better, a United Nations Program
Building Back Better, a program of disaster relief organization Medair
Build Back Better, a slogan of the Joe Biden 2020 presidential campaign
Build Back Better Plan, an economic and infrastructure package proposed by Joe Biden
Build Back Better Act, a bill introduced in the 117th Congress
Build Back Better World, an initiative taken by G7 countries
Build Back Better, US president Bill Clinton's humanitarian program in Haiti
Build Back Better, a motto of Zamboanga City, Philippines
Build Back Better, a slogan in the 2020 Singaporean general election
Build Back Better, a slogan adopted by the Conservative Party (UK) in 2020